Kim Min-hyeok (born 16 August 1992) is a South Korean footballer who plays as a midfielder for Seongnam FC.

He was debuted in group stage of 2015 AFC Champions League.

References

External links
 

1992 births
Living people
Association football midfielders
South Korean footballers
FC Seoul players
Gwangju FC players
Pohang Steelers players
Seongnam FC players
K League 1 players
K League 2 players
Footballers from Seoul